The 1938 Tschammerpokal Final decided the winner of the 1938 Tschammerpokal, the 4th season of Germany's knockout football cup competition. It was played on 8 January 1939 at the Olympiastadion in Berlin. Rapid Wien won the match 3–1 against FSV Frankfurt, to claim their 1st cup title.

Route to the final
The Tschammerpokal began the final stage with 78 teams in a single-elimination knockout cup competition. Midway through the competition, Austrian teams were merged into the competition following the Anschluss. There were a total of six rounds leading up to the final for the German teams, and a total of three for the Austrian teams. Teams were drawn against each other, and the winner after 90 minutes would advance. If still tied, 30 minutes of extra time was played. If the score was still level, a replay would take place at the original away team's stadium. If still level after 90 minutes, 30 minutes of extra time was played. If the score was still level, a second replay would take place at the original home team's stadium. If still level after 90 minutes, 30 minutes of extra time was played. If the score was still level, a drawing of lots would decide who would advance to the next round.

Note: In all results below, the score of the finalist is given first (H: home; A: away).

Match

Details

References

External links
 Match report at kicker.de 
 Match report at WorldFootball.net
 Match report at Fussballdaten.de 

FSV Frankfurt matches
SK Rapid Wien matches
Tschammerpokal Final
1938
Football competitions in Berlin
1930s in Berlin
January 1939 sports events